Enanthic acid, also called heptanoic acid, is an organic compound composed of a seven-carbon chain terminating in a carboxylic acid functional group. It is a colorless oily liquid with an unpleasant, rancid odor. It contributes to the odor of some rancid oils. It is slightly soluble in water, but very soluble in ethanol and ether. Salts and esters of enanthic acid are called enanthates or heptanoates.

Its name derives from the Latin oenanthe which is in turn derived from the Ancient Greek oinos "wine" and anthos "blossom."

Production

The methyl ester of ricinoleic acid, obtained from castor bean oil, is the main commercial precursor to enanthic acid. It is pyrolyzed to the methyl ester of 10-undecenoic acid and heptanal, which is then air-oxidized to the carboxylic acid. Approximately 20,000 tons were consumed in Europe and US in 1980.

Laboratory preparations of enanthic acid include permanganate oxidation of heptanal and 1-octene.

Uses
Enanthic acid is used in the preparation of esters, such as ethyl enanthate, which are used in fragrances and as artificial flavors. Enanthic acid is used to esterify steroids in the preparation of drugs such as testosterone enanthate, trenbolone enanthate, drostanolone enanthate, and methenolone enanthate (Primobolan).

The triglyceride ester of enanthic acid is the triheptanoin, which is used in certain medical conditions as a nutritional supplement.

Safety 
Enanthic acid is toxic if swallowed and corrosive.

See also
 List of saturated fatty acids
 List of carboxylic acids

References

Alkanoic acids
Fatty acids